Shanawdithit (ca. 1801 – June 6, 1829), also noted as Shawnadithit, Shawnawdithit, Nancy April and Nancy Shanawdithit, was the last known living member of the Beothuk people, who inhabited Newfoundland, Canada. Remembered for her contributions to the historical understanding of Beothuk culture, including drawings depicting interactions with European settlers, Shanawdithit died of tuberculosis in St. John's, Newfoundland on June 6, 1829.

Early life with the Beothuk
Shanawdithit was born near a large lake on the island of Newfoundland in about 1801. At the time the Beothuk population was dwindling, their traditional way of life becoming increasingly unsustainable in the face of encroachment from both European colonial settlements and other Indigenous peoples, as well as infectious diseases from Europe such as smallpox against which they had little or no immunity. The Beothuks were also slowly being cut off from the sea, one of their food sources.

During this period, most Indigenous nations in the Americas tolerated some level of contact with European settlers. The resulting trade generally afforded them the opportunity to maintain at least a minimal standard of living. In contrast, Beothuks had long avoided this sort of interaction with outsiders. Trappers and furriers regarded the Beothuks as thieves and would sometimes attack them. As a child, Shanawdithit was shot by a white trapper while washing venison in a river. She suffered from the injury for some time, but recovered.

In 1819, Shanawdithit's aunt Demasduwit was captured by a party of settlers led by John Peyton Jr. and the few remaining Beothuks fled. In the spring of 1823, Shanawdithit lost her father, who died after falling through ice. Most of her extended family had already died from a combination of starvation, illness, exposure and attacks from European settlers. In April 1823 Shanawdithit, along with her mother, Doodebewshet, and her sister, whose Beothuk name is unknown, encountered trappers while searching for food in the Badger Bay area.  William Cull and the three women were taken to St. John's, where Shanawdithit's mother and sister died of tuberculosis.

Later life in the Newfoundland Colony

The settlers in the Newfoundland Colony renamed Shanawdithit "Nancy April" after the month in which she was captured, taking her to Exploits Island where she worked as a servant in the Peyton household and learned some English. The colonial government hoped she would become a bridge to her people, but she refused to leave with any expedition, saying the Beothuks would kill anyone who had been with the Europeans, as a kind of religious sacrifice and redemption for those who had been killed.

In September 1828, Shanawdithit was relocated to St. John's to live in the household of William Eppes Cormack, the founder of the Beothuk Institution. A Scottish emigrant, Newfoundland entrepreneur and philanthropist, he recorded much of what Shanawdithit told him about her people and added notes to her drawings. Shanawdithit stayed in Cormack's care until early 1829 when he left Newfoundland. Cormack returned to Great Britain where he stayed for some time in Liverpool with John McGregor, a Scotsman whom he had known in Canada, sharing many of his materials on the Beothuks.

Following Cormack's departure, Shanawdithit was cared for by the attorney general, James Simms. She spent the last nine months of her life at his home, having been in frail health for a number of years. William Carson tended her, but in 1829 Shanawdithit died in a St. John's hospital after her long fight with tuberculosis. In addition of an obituary announcement in a local St. John's newspaper on June 12, 1829, the death of Shanawdithit was reported in the London Times on September 14, 1829. The announcement noted that Shanawdithit "exhibited extraordinary strong natural talents" and identified the Beothuk as "an anomaly in the history of man" for not establishing or maintaining relationships with European settlers or other Indigenous peoples.

Following her death
Following Shanawdithit's death Carson performed a postmortem and noted peculiarities with the parietal bone of the skull, eventually sending it to Royal College of Physicians in London for study. Shanawdithit's remains were buried in the graveyard of St. Mary the Virgin Church on the south side of St. John's. In 1938, the Royal College of Physicians gave her skull to the Royal College of Surgeons. It was lost in the German Blitz bombing of London in World War II.

Meanwhile, in 1903, the church graveyard had been lost to railway construction. The church was torn down in 1963. A monument on the site reads: This monument marks the site of the Parish Church of St. Mary the Virgin during the period 1859–1963. Fishermen and sailors from many ports found a spiritual haven within its hallowed walls. Near this spot is the burying place of Nancy Shanawdithit, very probably the last of the Beothuks, who died on June 6, 1829.

Legacy

Shanawdithit played a vital role in documenting what little is known about the Beothuk people. Researcher Ingeborg Marshall has argued that a valid understanding of Beothuk history and culture is directly impacted by how and by whom historical records were created, pointing to the ethnocentric nature of European accounts which positioned native populations as inherently inferior. She notes that without Shanawdithit's accounts of her nations' later life, the Beothuk voice is nearly absent from historical accounts.

Shanawdithit was recognized as a National Historic Person in 2000. The announcement coincided with the installation of a statue depicting Shanawdithit by Gerald Squires, titled The Spirit of the Beothuk, at the Beothuk Interpretation Centre near Boyd's Cove. In 2007 a plaque commemorating her life was unveiled at St. John's Bannerman Park acknowledging her contributions to the historical accounts of encounters between the Beothuk and European settlers, and the apprehension of her aunt, Demasduit, by John Peyton Jr.

Shanawdithit is widely known among Newfoundlanders. In 1851, a local paper, the Newfoundlander, called her "a princess of Terra Nova".  In 1999, The Telegram readers voted her the most notable Aboriginal person of the past 1,000 years. She had 57% of the votes.

See also

Notable Aboriginal people of Canada
List of people of Newfoundland and Labrador

Further reading

References

External links
Appendix: "Letter from the Lordbishop of Nova Scotia", Society for Propagation of the Gospel (SPG) Annual Report 1827. London: S.P.G. and C. & J. Rivington, 1828: 85-88, Memorial University of Newfoundland & Labrador Website

1801 births
1829 deaths
19th-century deaths from tuberculosis
19th-century First Nations people
Anti-Indigenous racism in Canada
Beothuk people
First Nations artists
Last known speakers of a Native American language
Newfoundland Colony people
People from Newfoundland (island)
Persons of National Historic Significance (Canada)
Tuberculosis deaths in Newfoundland and Labrador
First Nations women
19th-century Canadian women artists